{{DISPLAYTITLE:C12H8O4}}
The molecular formula C12H8O4 (molar mass : 216.19 g/mol) may refer to:

 Bergapten, a psoralen found in bergamot essential oil
 Methoxsalen, a drug used to treat psoriasis, eczema or vitiligo
 2,6-Naphthalenedicarboxylic acid

Molecular formulas